() is a retailer of automotive parts and accessories based in Japan, with branches primarily in Asia and stores also located in France.

Etymology
Autobacs was given a backronym as follows, which reflects the products the company provided prior to its renaming to Autobacs in 1980:
AUTO: Appeal, Unique, Tire, Oil
BACS: Battery, Accessory, Car electronics, Service
"Seven" in the company name is said to reflect Autobacs's philosophy of searching for seventh products for customers.

History
Autobacs was founded by Toshio Sumino in 1947 in Fukushima-ku, Osaka as Suehiro Shokai Co., Ltd., which was reorganized into Fuji Shokai Co., Ltd. a year later.

In 1960, Sumino opened the Fuji Drive Shop, Japan's first large-scale automotive goods store, and in 1969 he became involved in motorsport sponsorship by sponsoring a car in the Japanese Grand Prix.

In 1974, the first of the Autobacs stores, the "Autobacs Higashi Osaka Store", was opened in Daitō, Osaka. The following year, Autobacs would run its first franchisee store, the "Autobacs Hakodate Nakamichi Store" in Hakodate, Hokkaidō. In 1977, Autobacs would start to develop and sell its own motor oil and tires to be sold in its own stores. At the end of the decade, Autobacs opened its 100th store, and in 1984 opened its 200th store. The company's name was officially changed from Fuji Shokai to Autobacs in March of 1980.

On 11 July 2005, Autobacs entered a collaboration agreement with UK retailer Halfords. On 13 December 2005, Autobacs acquired 5% of the company (11,400,000 shares) at approximately ¥7.5 billion.

ASL 

In the late 1990s, specialty car manufacturer Tommykaira ran into financial difficulties as a result of the Lost Decade. In 2001, it was acquired by Autobacs, which renamed its car manufacturing arm ASL (Autobacs Sportscar Laboratory), thus allowing the aftermarket parts manufacturer to continue trading with its usual name.

The first car planned to be produced by ASL was the Garaiya. Customers would take part in the final development of their car's suspension to tailor it to their preferences or driving style.

A modified Garaiya was fielded in the GT300 class of Super GT from 2003 through 2012 by Autobacs Racing Team Aguri, a team formed by Autobacs and Japanese former F1 driver Aguri Suzuki.

The prototype was fitted with a modified RB26DETT engine producing  and also featured the R34 Skyline GT-R's ATTESA-ETS all-wheel drive system.

References

External links
Autobacs Seven Co., Ltd. 
Autobacs World 

Retail companies established in 1947
Vehicle manufacturing companies established in 1947
Car manufacturers of Japan
Auto parts suppliers of Japan
Automotive part retailers
Sports car manufacturers
Midori-kai
Retail companies based in Tokyo
Companies listed on the Tokyo Stock Exchange